The women's 50 metre backstroke event in swimming at the 2013 World Aquatics Championships took place on 31 July and 1 August at the Palau Sant Jordi in Barcelona, Spain.

Records
Prior to this competition, the existing world and championship records were:

Results

Heats
The heats were held at 10:00.

Semifinals
The semifinals were held at 18:12.

Semifinal 1

Semifinal 2

Final
The final was held at 19:14.

References

External links
Barcelona 2013 Swimming Coverage

Backstroke 0050 metre, women's
World Aquatics Championships
2013 in women's swimming